Dollar Lake is a small tarn located on Aneroid Mountain in the Eagle Cap Wilderness of Northeastern Oregon, United States. It likely received its name because of its size and its almost perfectly round shape, much like that of a silver dollar. It is the third-highest lake in the Eagle Cap Wilderness.

Trail
Dollar Lake can be accessed by Trail 1802. A navigation device such as a compass or a GPS is recommended.

See also
 List of lakes in Oregon

References 

Lakes of Oregon
Lakes of Wallowa County, Oregon
Eagle Cap Wilderness